Jepsonia is a small genus of flowering plants containing three species. The Jepsonia is a perennial with a cormlike caudex, toothed leaves, and a cyme inflorescence that blooms in the fall. Jepsonia plants are native to California and Baja California.

Species include:
Jepsonia heterandra - foothill jepsonia
Jepsonia malvifolia - island jepsonia
Jepsonia parryi - Parry's jepsonia

External links
Jepson Manual Treatment

Saxifragaceae
Saxifragaceae genera